Luther Burbank High School is a high school in San Antonio, Texas. In 2015, the school was rated "Met Standard" by the Texas Education Agency.

History
When Burbank opened in September 1937, it was initially called the Steve's Gardens Jr.-Sr. High School, soon renamed for Luther Burbank, an American botanist, horticulturist, and agricultural science pioneer. Burbank was the only school in San Antonio to offer an agriculture program. The program boasted a 75-acre student farm, the largest on-campus farm in Texas. Unlike Ag programs that Focus on livestock, Burbank students were also able to grow row crops such as corn, sorghum, sunflowers, and many others.

By the turn of the 21st Century, large portions of the farm were turned over to create Sports Facilities for SAISD. After Hurricane Katrina, the New Orleans Saints practiced at the Burbank sports complex from 2004 to 2006.

Athletics
The Burbank Bulldogs compete in the following sports:
 
Baseball
Basketball
Cross Country
Football
Golf
Soccer
Softball
Swimming and Diving
Tennis
Track and Field
Volleyball
Water Polo

Notable alumni
Joe Horlen (born 1937), Major League Baseball All Star pitcher
 Gary Bell (born 1936), Major League Baseball All Star pitcher
 Vincent Valdez (born 1977), artist
Julian S. Garcia (born 1950), Writer, Editor, ViAztlan International Journal. Frequent Op-Ed writer for San Antonio Express-News.

References

External links
Luther Burbank High School website

San Antonio Independent School District high schools
High schools in San Antonio
1937 establishments in Texas
Educational institutions established in 1937